Albert Mayer (24 April 18922 August 1914) was the first German soldier to die in World War I. He died one day before  the German Empire formally declared war on France.

Early life
Albert Otto Walter Mayer was born on 24 April 1892 at Magdeburg, in Saxony-Anhalt. His family had moved to the area of Mulhouse, Alsace when he was a boy. He enlisted into the Imperial German Army in 1912. In August 1914, he was a lieutenant in his local cavalry unit, the Jäger Regt-zu-Pferd Nr 5, which was part of the 29th Cavalry Brigade of the 29th Infantry Division, garrisoned in Mulhouse.

Death 

During the morning of 2 August 1914, a cavalry patrol led by Leutnant Mayer crossed into France before war had been officially declared. Upon entering French territory, it was confronted by a French Army sentry, who escaped after Mayer attacked him with his sabre. Around 9.30 a.m., the German patrol entered the village of Joncherey. French soldiers billeted nearby were notified and deployed to confront the German intruders. At 10:00 a.m., Corporal Jules-André Peugeot, leading the French troops, saw the German force and shouted a command to stop as they were under arrest, to which Mayer pulled out his pistol and shot at Peugeot, hitting him in the shoulder and mortally wounding him. Peugeot, in turn, fired his weapon at Mayer but missed. Other soldiers of Peugeot's detachment then opened fire at the Germans, hitting Mayer in the stomach and head, killing him, with the remainder of the German patrol riding away from the scene. Mayer's body was buried in Joncherey the next day. The body was later removed to the German military cemetery at Illfurth near Mulhouse, where his gravestone is marked with the inscription "1st German Casualty of the World War 1914–18". His helmet was retrieved by the French authorities and today is on display at the Musée de l'Armée in Paris.

See also
Jules Andre Peugeot, the first French Army soldier killed, 1914
John Parr, the first British Army soldier killed, 1914
Thomas Enright, one of the first three American Army soldiers killed, 1917
Merle Hay,  one of the first three American Army soldiers killed, 1917
James Bethel Gresham, one of the first three American Army soldiers killed, 1917
George Edwin Ellison, the last British Army soldier killed in World War I, at 9:30 a.m. 11 November
Augustin Trébuchon, last French soldier killed, at 10:45 a.m. 11 November
George Lawrence Price, last Commonwealth soldier killed in World War I, 10:58 a.m. 11 November.
Henry Gunther, last soldier killed in World War I, at 10:59 a.m. 11 November.

References

External links 
 
 

1892 births
1914 deaths
German military personnel killed in World War I
Military personnel from Magdeburg
German Army personnel of World War I